Squale (Software Quality Enhancement) is an open-source platform that helps monitoring software quality for multi-language applications. It currently supports Java out-of-the-box, and can also analyse C/C++ and Cobol code with an adapter to McCabe tool. Squale is distributed under the terms of the LGPL v3 licence.

Squale is partially funded by the French FUI (Fonds unique interministériel),), labeled by the Systematic Paris-Region competitive cluster  and is supported by its FLOSS group.

See also

 Software quality
 ISO/IEC 9126
 Software quality model

References

External links
 
 Squale download page
 Squale Demo

Free computer programming tools
Free software testing tools